Jérémy Châtelain was the self-titled debut album by French musician Jérémy Châtelain. The album was released in October 2003. The album yielded 4 singles, including two Top 40 Hits.

Track listing
Vivre Ça - 4:02
Parce Que Vous Le Faîtes - 3:28
C'est Ça Ma Vie - 3:17
J'aimerai - 2:45
Je M'envole - 3:23
Harold Et Maud (Featuring Freko) - 4:22
Je M'en Fous - 2:43
Amour.com - 3:11
Georgy - 3:52
Belle Histoire - 3:14
Porte Dauphine - 4:12
Laisse-moi - 3:46
Laisse-moi (Alternate version) [Hidden Track] - 3:35

Charts

Singles

References

2003 albums